Collobrières is a commune in the Var department in the Provence-Alpes-Côte d'Azur region in southeastern France.

Geography

Climate

Collobrières has a hot-summer Mediterranean climate (Köppen climate classification Csa).

Main exports 
Collobrières main exports are edible chestnuts which are made into things like marron glacé and ice cream. They also grow trees for cork production.

See also
Communes of the Var department

References

Communes of Var (department)